Thayer Lake also known as Thayer's Lake or Finn's Lake is a lake in Keweenaw County, Michigan in the United States.

The lake's official name is attested to as far back as 1897.

References 

Lakes of Michigan
Geography of Keweenaw County, Michigan